Eric Ernest Jolliffe  (31 January 190716 November 2001) was an Australian cartoonist and illustrator.

Early life
Born in Portsmouth, England, he was the youngest boy in a family of twelve children. The family migrated to Perth, Western Australia in 1911 before moving to Sydney after six months, where they settled in Balmain. Joliffe left school at the age of fifteen, where he spent the next six years in the country New South Wales and Queensland, working as a boundary rider, rabbit trapper and in shearing sheds.

Artistic career
A visit to Angus & Robertson bookstore, while visiting his family in Sydney, led to the discovery of a book on drawing. He afterwards reflected: "I learned to my surprise that art wasn't necessarily a gift divine but a craft that could be studied and worked at".

Jolliffe enrolled in an introductory course at East Sydney Technical College (now the National Art School), where his teachers commented on his lack of talent. During the Great Depression he worked as a window cleaner, during which time he inundated The Bulletin with cartoons, which they initially rejected. Eventually they began to buy his cartoons and by the beginning of World War II he became a regular contributor, taking over Andy from Arthur Horner. During the war he served as a camouflage officer with the RAAF and spent time in Arnhem Land.

After the war he joined Smith's Weekly but resigned and began freelancing selling his cartoon strips Saltbush Bill and Witchetty's Tribe to Pix magazine. He was particularly fond of "bush" subjects. Another cartoon strip, Sandy Blight, appeared in Sydney's Sun-Herald. In 1973 Jolliffe began publishing his own magazine, Jolliffe's Outback.

Legacy
George Blaikie recalled in 1979 that Jolliffe "had humped the bluey and toiled at all kinds of farm and station jobs. Wherever he went he sketched the minutiae most people failed to see – shacks and sheds, funny old gates and tree stumps they hinged on, bark roofs, billabongs and cows in bogs. Such authentic reference was poured into his gags and he became our most brilliant interpreter of the countryside."

Australian Aborigines figured largely in Jolliffe's work, including in his numerous pen and pencil portraits in Witchetty's Tribe. Jim Hodge observed that "sensitivity without sentiment describes his approach" and Tony Stephens noted that "Joliffe made Aboriginal men hunters with a sense of humour" and "the women as beautiful as ... models".

Jolliffe's cartoons enjoyed great success with the Australian reading public. Saltbush Bill ran "in Pix magazine for almost 50 years from 1945" and his other series experienced similar success.

Personal life
From 1932 Jolliffe was married to the Scottish-born May H. Clark. She died in Chatswood in 1993. Their daughter Margaret ("Meg") had died in 1989.

He died on 16 November 2001 at the age of 94. His funeral service was held at Ourimbah on the Central Coast of New South Wales.

Honours and awards
 2009: Member of Hall of Fame of the Australian Cartoonists' Association
 1998: Medal of the Order of Australia (OAM) for "service to art as a cartoonist and illustrator"
 1985, 1986: Stanley Award: "Single Gag Cartoonist of the Year"
 1960, 1961: Sydney Savage Club Cartoonist Award

See also
 Bush carpentry
 Minties
 Slab hut

References

Further reading

Books and magazines by Jolliffe
 Corroboree : Aboriginal Cartoon Fun,  Cremorne [N.S.W.] : E. Jolliffe [1946] - online copy at State Library Victoria

Books about Jolliffe and his work
 ACE Biographical Portraits: The Artists Behind the Comic Book Characters: The Australian Comic Book Exhibition, Australian Comics 1930s-1990s, Touring Australia During 1995/96 / edited by Annette Shiell and Ingrid Unger (1994)
 Joan Kerr, Artists and Cartoonists: In Black and White, Sydney: S. H. Ervin Gallery, 1999
 Annette Shiell and Mick Stone, eds., Bonzer: Australian Comics, 1900s-1990s, Redhill South, Melbourne: Elgua Media, 1998
 Richard Rae, Cartoonists of Australia, View Productions, 1983.
 Toby Burrows and Grant Stone, eds., Comics in Australia and New Zealand: The Collections, the Collectors, the Creators, New York, London, Norwood (Australia): The Haworth Press, Inc., 1994, p. 28
 Vane Lindsay, Drawing From Life: A History of the Australian Black and White Artists' Club, Sydney: State Library of NSW Press, 1994
 Fifty Years of Australian Cartooning, The Journalists’ Club, 1964
 Graeme Cliffe, From Sunbeams To Sunset. The Rise And Fall Of The Australian Comic Book (1924-1965), Margate Beach: Ozcomics, 2019
 Frederick Luis Aldama, Graphic Indigeneity: Comics in the Americas and Australasia, University Press of Mississippi, 2020, pp. 56–57
 Vane Lindsay, The Inked-in Image, Melbourne: Hutchinson of Australia, 1979
 John Ryan, Panel by Panel: A History of Australian Comics, Melbourne: Cassell Australia 1979

External links
 Conversation with Eric Jolliffe (sound recording) - interviewed by Hazel de Berg on 18 November 1974
 Interview with Eric Jolliffe, bush cartoonist and comic strip artist (sound recording) - interviewed by Ros Bowden., 5 December 1995.
 Catalog at the National Library of Australia of Eric Jolliffe's material.
 Capturing The Territory in Cartoons; Remembering the Genius of Eric Joliffe'' (sic) - Annie Gastin ABC Radio

1907 births
2001 deaths
Australian cartoonists
Australian comics artists
British emigrants to Australia
Recipients of the Medal of the Order of Australia